Miroslav Luberda (born 18 December 1963) is a Czech wrestler. He competed in the men's freestyle 130 kg at the 1988 Summer Olympics.

References

1963 births
Living people
Czech male sport wrestlers
Olympic wrestlers of Czechoslovakia
Wrestlers at the 1988 Summer Olympics
Sportspeople from Ostrava